Events from the year 1544 in Sweden

Incumbents
 Monarch – Gustav I

Events

 - The Västerås arvförening declare Sweden to be a Hereditary monarchy, with the right of the eldest legitimate son to be heir to the throne and the younger sons to be Dukes. It is also officially declared a Protestant Kingdom: Requiem, the worship of saints and pilgrimages is banned, crucifixes is removed from the churches, and the opposition to the new religious order is declared heretics. 
 - Olaus Magnus is appointed Catholic Arch Bishop of Sweden by the pope in his exile in Rome.
 The former nuns of the Skänninge Abbey are forcibly moved to Vreta Abbey.

Births

Deaths

 - Johannes Magnus, last Catholic archbishop (born 1488)

References

 
Years of the 16th century in Sweden
Sweden